Obrium prosperum is a species of beetle in the Cerambycidae (longhorn beetles) family. The scientific name of this species was first published in 2008 by Holzschuh.

References

Obriini
Beetles described in 2008